RFA Nasprite (A252) was a Sprite-class tanker of the Royal Fleet Auxiliary. She served during the Second World War.

She was laid up in reserve at Devonport on 31 August 1954, and put up for disposal in August 1963. She arrived at Amsterdam for scrapping at Willebroek on 5 February 1964.

References

Sprite-class tankers
Tankers of the Royal Fleet Auxiliary
1940 ships